Satan's Mistress (also known as Demon Rage, Demon Seed, Fury of the Succubus and Dark Eyes) is a 1980 horror film that was theatrically released in 1982. It is about a sexually frustrated housewife, Lisa (played by actress Lana Wood), who, having been distanced from her husband Carl (Don Galloway), begins having nightly trysts with an apparition that gradually takes on the form of a tall, dark stranger (played by Kabir Bedi) who turns out to be a ghost from the other side.

The film gives higher screen credit to Britt Ekland, who had only a minor role but more star power, having previously played Mary Goodnight in The Man with the Golden Gun. Lana Wood is known to many as Plenty O'Toole from the James Bond film Diamonds Are Forever. Kabir Bedi was featured as the Bond villain's henchman Gobinda in Octopussy.

The film was released the same year as the similarly themed The Entity, differing in that the sex in Satan's Mistress is consensual.

The film has a cameo by veteran horror actor John Carradine as Father Stratten.

Cast
Britt Ekland - Ann-Marie 
Lana Wood - Lisa 
Kabir Bedi - the spirit 
Don Galloway - Carl 
John Carradine - Father Stratten 
Sherry Scott - Michelle 
Elise-Anne - Belline 
Tom Hallick - Burt

References

External links
 

1982 horror films
1982 films
1980s supernatural horror films
1980s English-language films